Simon McKillop-Davies (born 23 September 1972) is an Australian swimmer. He competed in the men's 200 metre butterfly event at the 1992 Summer Olympics.

References

External links
 

1972 births
Living people
Australian male butterfly swimmers
Olympic swimmers of Australia
Swimmers at the 1992 Summer Olympics
Place of birth missing (living people)